Franklin County High School is the largest of three public high schools in Frankfort, Kentucky, United States, and is one of two high schools operated by Franklin County Public Schools.  The campus also houses the Franklin County Career & Technical Center, which offers vocational training.  The principal of the school is Chris Tracy.

History
Franklin County High was opened in the fall of 1958 and dedicated on November 30 of that year. It consolidated Elkhorn, Bridgeport, Bald Knob, and Peaks Mill High Schools. Franklin County is named for Benjamin Franklin, and the high school's mascot, the Flyer, was chosen in honor of Franklin's kite experiment.  The mascot itself is a bird named "Freddie Falcon".

In 1981, the Franklin County district was split into two high school attendance zones with the opening of Western Hills High School, with Franklin County High now serving primarily the eastern half of the county, including eastern portions of the city of Frankfort. The central part of the city is served by a separate district, Frankfort Independent Schools, which operates the other public high school in the county, Frankfort High School.

In 1990, science classrooms and some math classrooms were enlarged, two computer labs were added, and the library was expanded. A more extensive renovation project began in the summer of 1997 and continued uninterrupted through the summer of 2001. The facade was updated, the original band room and administrative offices were torn down, and the original bus circle was removed.  New music classrooms, practice rooms, business classrooms, and offices were constructed.  Also added was a new center hallway on both the first and second floors; the second-floor hallway connects the original front wing with the back foyer. The cafeteria, auditorium, and gymnasium also were updated, and the library and the remaining original classrooms were enlarged.

In late 2015 Franklin County High School was featured in a national OxiClean commercial. The first of the two 30-second commercials is called "Pride", and it features the team's members and equipment manager sharing their enthusiasm for OxiClean and how clean the team's uniforms look.

Head Principals
 Clyde Orr (1958-1959)
 Garland Kemper (1959-1960)
 Ronald Connelly (1960-1963)
 Elmer Moore (1963-1966)
 John Underwood (1966-1967)
 Robert Hoagland (1967-1991)
 Jim Shrock (1991-1999)
 Mike Henderson (1999)
 Sharon Collett (1999-2012)
 Stirling "Buddy" Sampson (2012-2017)
 Charles Lewis (2017-2021)
 Chris Tracy (2022-Present)

Academics
FCHS offers three diploma choices for students: Enrichment and Academic The Enrichment Diploma requires 15.5 core units and 11.5 elective units.  The Academic option requires 18.5 core units and 10.5 elective units.  Students are graded on a 4-point GPA scale.

JROTC
There is an Air Force Junior ROTC Wing at the school. KY-20021 supports the school by providing Color Guards for home football and basketball games. The Color Guard has presented flags flown over the capital for former congressman Ben Chandler at Hearn Elementary, and also participated in the 2007 Inauguration Parade for the former Governor of Kentucky, Steve Beshear and the 2015 Inauguration Parade for the former Governor Matt Bevin

The rifle exhibition team started in 2005, has performed for the school, a Kentucky State University football game at halftime, and various elementary schools in the area. A Kitty Hawk Air Society chapter, named the William H. Cornish Chapter, is also in place.

Along with color guard, drill, and rifle exhibition, the unit also has a Raiders team.

AFJROTC Unit KY-20021 has attended multiple summer leadership schools, and the cadets have won numerous awards.

Athletics
The school is a member of the Kentucky High School Athletic Association (KHSAA).  FCHS offers its students the opportunity to participate in multiple sports:
Boys and girls:
Cheerleading (not governed by KHSAA), **Basketball, cross country, golf, soccer, swimming, track and field, tennis, Archery
Boys:
Baseball, football, wrestling
Girls:
 Dance Team (not governed by KHSAA), softball, volleyball
The school's gymnasium, tennis court, football stadium/track, baseball, softball and soccer fields are located behind the school.  A training facility with locker rooms and a weight room is found beside the football stadium.

The Flyers' main rivals are the Western Hills Wolverines and the Frankfort Panthers.

The Flyers' football stadium, Benny Watkins Field, also hosts the sprint football team of nearby Midway University. Midway began play in that sport in 2022.

Team records

Fight song
The Franklin County High Fight Song is mostly played at sporting events where the school's band is present, mainly football and basketball games.  As the band begins to play the song, fans stand up, clap and sing along with the music.

Alma mater
The school's Alma Mater is not as widely known as the fight song and is mainly played at graduation and other scholarly events.  The "Avenue of Trees" referenced in the song describes the tall oak trees lining the shared driveway between the school and Elkhorn Middle School from the entrance at East Main Street.  However, this entrance was closed and no longer exists because of traffic re-routing.  Both schools now have separate entrances to alleviate traffic.

Many high schools in Kentucky use re-written lyrics to popular college songs, both Franklin County's Fight Song and Alma Mater are original works by the school's first band director, David Livingston, written specifically for Franklin County High School.

Alumni 

 NFL Quarterback Logan Woodside

References

External links

Franklin County Schools

Buildings and structures in Frankfort, Kentucky
Public high schools in Kentucky
Schools in Franklin County, Kentucky
Educational institutions established in 1958
1958 establishments in Kentucky